Eggbornsville is an unincorporated community in Culpeper County, in the U.S. state of Virginia.

History
A post office called Eggbornsville was established in 1877, and remained in operation until it was discontinued in 1915. The community was named for the Eggborn family, the original owners of the town site.

References

Unincorporated communities in Culpeper County, Virginia
Unincorporated communities in Virginia